Salute the Toff is a 1952 British crime film directed by Maclean Rogers and starring John Bentley and Carol Marsh.  The film was based on the 1941 novel of the same name by John Creasey, the sixth in the series featuring upper-class sleuth Richard Rollinson, also known as "The Toff".  This film and another Toff adaptation, Hammer the Toff, were shot back-to-back at Nettlefold Studios in the summer of 1951.  They were released to cinemas in January and May 1952 respectively.

Neither film was thought to have survived and both were classed as "missing, believed lost", although there was a degree of hope that they might be lurking as yet uncatalogued in British TV archives.  Both films are included on the British Film Institute's "75 Most Wanted" list of missing British feature films. This changed in 2013 when Salute The Toff was finally released on DVD from Renown Pictures Limited.

Plot
The Honourable Richard Rollinson (Bentley) is a well-known private detective who has friends and contacts in all echelons of society from the wealthy West End set to the lowest East End hovels.  He likes to take on cases on behalf of underdogs, and is feared by the criminal underworld for his fearsome reputation of always getting his man.

Young secretary Fay Gretton (Marsh) comes to Rollinson, worried that her employer has not shown up for work for several days and cannot be contacted.  Rollinson breaks into the man's flat and finds a body – not that of Fay's missing boss, but the son of a millionaire businessman.  The missing man is the prime suspect, and it is up to Rollinson to get to the bottom of the case, aided by his East End contacts.  After a series of dramatic events, including Fay being abducted and tied up, the truth is finally revealed, the missing man is found, and Rollinson proves that he is innocent of any wrongdoing.

Cast

 John Bentley as Richard Rollinson
 Carol Marsh as Fay Gretton
 Valentine Dyall as Inspector Grice
 Shelagh Fraser as Myra Lorne
 June Elvin as Lady Anthea
 Arthur Hill as Ted Harrison
 Michael Golden as Benny Kless
 Roddy Hughes as Jolly
 Wally Patch as Bert Ebbutt
 Vi Stevens as Emily Ebbutt
 Tony Britton as Draycott
 John Forbes-Robertson as Gerald Harvey
 Peter Bull as Lorne
 Peter Gawthorne as Mortimer Harvey
 Pauline Johnson as 	Phyllis Harvey
 Peter Dyneley as 	Lady Anthea's Husband
 Peter Swanwick as Night Porter
 Andreas Malandrinos as Frederico

Reception
Salute the Toff appears to have received a favourable reception from reviewers.  Kine Weekly described it as "a sturdy, comprehensive yarn", while the Daily Film Renter called it "a deep and varied plot of robbery and murder, calculated to keep audience attention alert, a popular winner in the mystery and murder category".  Today's Cinema enjoyed the film, but pointed out that sophisticated fare was not on the menu by classing it as a "bustling crime and detection action of the brand beloved by the masses".

See also
List of rediscovered films

References

External links 
 BFI 75 Most Wanted entry, with extensive notes
 

1952 films
1952 crime films
British crime films
British black-and-white films
Films based on British novels
Films directed by Maclean Rogers
1950s rediscovered films
Rediscovered British films
Films about missing people
Films shot at Nettlefold Studios
Butcher's Film Service films
1950s English-language films
1950s British films